Un uomo ritorna (also known as Revenge) is a 1946 Italian drama film directed by Max Neufeld.

It was shown as part of a retrospective "Questi fantasmi: Cinema italiano ritrovato" at the 65th Venice International Film Festival.

Plot 

The film is set in April 1945. The engineer Sergio returns home to a town in Lazio after five years as a prisoner of war. He finds his homeland ravaged. The minefields and hydroelectric power plant were the main sources of employment and they are both destroyed. His old mother and a brother are still there but his wife Adele is working in Rome. Their son has been taken in a fascist raid. When Adele learns the son has died she goes after revenge armed with a gun.

Cast 
Gino Cervi: Sergio
Anna Magnani: Adele
Luisa Poselli: Luciana
Felice Romano: Carlo 
Ave Ninchi 
Aldo Silvani 
Olinto Cristina

Critical reception 

The film was censored and then rediscovered in 2008. A man called Giancarlo Mancini found a bad Italian copy interspersed with fragments from a French edition in Ripley's Home Video.  It has been described as a mediocre melodrama with obvious implausibilities in the plot and unsuited to Neufeld.

References

External links
 

1946 films
Italian drama films
Films directed by Max Neufeld
Italian black-and-white films
1946 drama films
1940s Italian films